Myelopsis minutularia is a species of snout moth in the genus Episcythrastis. It was described by George Duryea Hulst in 1887. It is found in most of North America.

References

Moths described in 1887
Phycitini